Hispania Nova (Latin for "New Hispania") can mean:
 Two Roman provinces
 Hispania Nova Citerior Antoniniana ("New Hither Hispania of Antoninus"), established by Caracalla from a short time after 211 over the Gallaecian conventi of Bracara, Lucus and perhaps Asturica.
 Hispania Nova Ulterior Tingitana ("New Yonder Hispania of Tangier"), the name set by Marcus Aurelius on Mauretania Tingitana when he linked it to Hispania instead of the Diocese of Africa
 A Latinate name for New Spain (i.e. Mexico) as in the scientific name of the Neotropical bluet (Enallagma novaehispaniae).

Provinces of the Roman Empire
Roman provinces in Hispania